, is one of the original 40 throws of Judo as developed by Jigoro Kano. It belongs to the fifth group, Gokyo, of the traditional throwing list, Gokyo (no waza), of Kodokan Judo. It is also part of the 67 throws of Kodokan Judo. It is classified as a side sacrifice technique, Yoko-sutemi.

Included systems 
Systems:
Kodokan Judo, Judo Lists
Lists:
The Canon Of Judo
Judo technique

Similar Techniques, Variants, and Aliases
English aliases:

 Floating throw

Similar techniques

 Uki waza
 Yoko otoshi
 Tani otoshi

Somehow related

 Yoko wakare

Judo technique